Clifford Daniel Hammonds (born December 18, 1985) is an American professional basketball player for Limburg United of the BNXT League. The  point guard played college basketball for Clemson.

High school and college basketball
Hammonds attended Cairo High School in his hometown Cairo, Georgia. He played college basketball at the Clemson University. In his four-year career with the Clemson Tigers, he played 134 games, averaging 10.9 points, 3.6 rebounds, 3.5 assists and 1.7 steals per game. Hammonds graduated from Clemson with a double major in architecture and psychology in 2008. He received the inaugural Skip Prosser Award, recognizing the top scholar-athlete in ACC men's basketball.

Professional career
His first team in Europe was Darüşşafaka of the Turkish Basketball League. He played there till the December 2008 when he moved to Efes Pilsen. With Efes he stayed only couple weeks and played five EuroLeague games, and then returned to Darüşşafaka where he finished the season.

During the summer of 2009 Hammonds played with Piratas de Quebradillas. The following season, he played with Peristeri, where he averaged 12.9 points, 3.1 rebounds, 3.7 assists and 1.5 steals per game in the Greek Basket League.

In June 2010, Hammonds signed a one–year deal with ASVEL Basket. In August 2011, he signed a one–year deal with Banvit. In August 2012, he signed a one–year deal with KK Igokea. In July 2013, Hammonds signed a two–year deal with Alba Berlin.

On October 31, 2015, Hammonds was selected by the Rio Grande Valley Vipers with the 12th overall pick in the 2015 NBA Development League Draft, only to be traded to the Reno Bighorns on draft night.

On September 24, 2016, Hammonds signed with Limoges CSP of the French LNB Pro A. On November 8, 2016, he left Limoges and signed with German club MHP Riesen Ludwigsburg for the rest of the season.

On July 21, 2017, Hammonds signed with s.Oliver Würzburg of the German Basketball Bundesliga for the 2017–18 season.

On July 31, 2018, Hammonds was announced by Belgian club Proximus Spirou.

On August 6, 2019, Hammonds returned to Greece after ten years and signed with Ifaistos Limnou.

On November 3, 2020, Hammonds has signed with Ionikos Nikaias of the Greek Basket League.

On January 7, 2021, Hammonds signed with Limburg United in Belgium.

Career statistics

EuroLeague

|-
| style="text-align:left;"| 2008–09
| style="text-align:left;"| Efes Pilsen
| 5 || 0 || 11.2 || .462 || .333 || .833 || .0 || .8 || .8 || .2 || 3.8 || 3.0
|-
| style="text-align:left;"| 2014–15
| style="text-align:left;"| Alba Berlin
| 20 || 20 || 25.8 || .457 || .353 || .750 || 2.1 || 2.9 || .6 || .4 || 8.1 || 7.2
|- class="sortbottom"
| style="text-align:left;"| Career
| style="text-align:left;"|
| 25 || 20 || 22.9 || .457 || .351 || .773 || 1.7 || 2.5 || .6 || .3 || 7.2 || 6.4

References

External links
 eurobasket.com profile
 EuroLeague profile
 FIBA profile
 TBLStat.net profile

1985 births
Living people
20th-century African-American people
21st-century African-American sportspeople
ABA League players
African-American basketball players
Alba Berlin players
American expatriate basketball people in Belgium
American expatriate basketball people in Bosnia and Herzegovina
American expatriate basketball people in France
American expatriate basketball people in Germany
American expatriate basketball people in Greece
American expatriate basketball people in Turkey
American men's basketball players
Anadolu Efes S.K. players
ASVEL Basket players
Bandırma B.İ.K. players
Basketball players from Georgia (U.S. state)
Clemson Tigers men's basketball players
Darüşşafaka Basketbol players
Ifaistos Limnou B.C. players
KK Igokea players
Limburg United players
Limoges CSP players
Riesen Ludwigsburg players
People from Cairo, Georgia
People from Fort Bragg, North Carolina
Peristeri B.C. players
Piratas de Quebradillas players
Point guards
Reno Bighorns players
S.Oliver Würzburg players
Spirou Charleroi players